Meet Corliss Archer  is an American television sitcom that aired on CBS (July 13, 1951 – August 10, 1951) and in syndication via the Ziv Company from April to December 1954. The program was an adaptation of the radio series of the same name, which was based on a series of short stories by F. Hugh Herbert.

Synopsis
Corliss Archer is a lovable blonde teenager who is delicately balancing her high-school life and relationship with goofy boyfriend Dexter Franklin, and her homelife with parents Harry and Janet Archer.

CBS version

Cast

Source: Encyclopedia of Television Shows, 1925 through 2010

Syndicated version

Cast

Production notes
The syndicated version of Meet Corliss Archer was executive produced by Frederick W. Ziv, and produced by ZIV Television Programs.

Syndication and DVD release
The series, which is public domain, is occasionally still repeated in the United States today, usually on small over-the-air networks and cable channels.

The series has also appeared on DVDs by companies such as Alpha Video, Echo Bridge, and Mill Creek.

See also
 Meet Corliss Archer, the radio version of the series which ran from 1943 to 1956.

References

External links 

  
 Episodes of Meet Corliss Archer at the Internet Archive

1954 American television series debuts
1954 American television series endings
1950s American sitcoms
American teen sitcoms
Black-and-white American television shows
English-language television shows
First-run syndicated television programs in the United States
Television series about teenagers